"Dashterov" (English: "By fields") is a song by Armenian musicians Aram Mp3 and Iveta Mukuchyan. The song premiered on February 11, 2017. The same day the singers sang the song at Dalma Garden Mall. The song is written by another Armenian musician Avet Barseghyan. Arrangements were made by Armenian DJ Serjo. Mukuchyan first talked about her collaboration in London during her interview with Wiwibloggs. The track sees the duo sing about chasing love across fields, valleys, mountains and canyons.
The song preceded a collaborative project of the same name.

Music video

The official music video was directed by Aramayis Hayrapetyan and released on February 11, 2017. The music video features Iveta and Aram dressed in matching threads, feeling the beat. The quirky production comes packed with a cow, milk and folk with TVs as heads. Mukuchyan is seen picking up a washboard and getting to work.

Credits and personnel
Credits adapted from YouTube.
 Aram Mp3 – production, vocals
 Iveta Mukuchyan – vocals
 Serjo – composition
 Levon Navasardyan – composition
 Karen Melkumyan - editing
 Aramayis Hayrapetyan - director
 Albert Grigoryan - production designer 
 Diana Shatverian - costume designer

Awards

See also 
 Armenian Folk

References

External links

2017 singles
2017 songs
Iveta Mukuchyan songs
Aram Mp3 songs
Songs written by Avet Barseghyan